The Museo Pambata or the Children's Museum, is a children's museum in the Ermita district of Manila, near Rizal Park, in the Philippines. It is located in the former Elks Club Building, built in 1910, along Roxas Boulevard at the corner of South Drive.

Background
The Museo Pambata is a children's interactive museum. Unlike traditional museums where items are stored behind glass and touching is highly discouraged, Museo Pambata invites visitors to learn with the exhibits by using their total senses. It envisions itself as a discovery museum and resource center promoting Filipino global culture, children's advocacy programs, and creative educational programs with linkages to global communities. The museum also has regular programs and events for various sectors.

History

Opened in 1994, Museo Pambata is dream come true of Nina Lim-Yuson, an early childhood educator and mother of four, who once brought her young children to the Boston Children’s Museum in America. They had so much fun with the museum's hands-on exhibits that she wished there was a similar place back home where her kids - and the millions of Filipino children - can learn and have fun at the same time.

In March 1993, Yuson, together with her mother, former Department of Social Welfare and Development secretary Estefania Aldaba-Lim, presented a proposal of their dream museum, to be situated in the historical Elks Club Building in Manila, to then Manila Mayor Alfredo Lim. Much to their joy and surprise, he readily approved it.

The Museo Pambata officers were elected in the first Board of Trustees meeting held in June 1993. Educators, visual artists, architects, museum workers and other professionals met regularly to brainstorm. Concepts were then translated into several theme rooms designed and produced pro bono by architect and stage designer Joselito Tecson.

In December 1993, the Manila City Council, in a memorandum of agreement (MOA) granted the Museo Pambata a 10-year-free-of-lease-use of the Elks Club Building. The funds raised by the board of trustees were used to start its rehabilitation.

In March 1994, the recognition dinner for Museo's first Ninongs and Ninangs, (sponsors who gave one million pesos each) namely Luis H. Lim Foundation, Juan and Lualhati Cojuangco Foundation, A.Y. Foundation, Petron Corporation, Fe S. Panlilio, Don Emilio T. Yap, Helena Z. Benitez, Security Bank and Trust Company, Landbank and GSIS.

Finally, on December 21, 1994, after a year of preparatory work, the museum opened its doors to children, youth and parents as the country's pioneering children's museum.

With a strong leadership, a definite plan of action and imminent success, the list of Ninongs and Ninangs has grown longer: Department of Tourism, PAGCOR, Department of Environment and Natural Resources, Department of Health, Sen. Ramon Magsaysay, Jr., Consuelo Alger Foundation, Philippine Charity Sweepstakes Office, Coca-Cola Foundation, Development Bank of the Philippines, PHINMA Group, Splash Foundation, Aldaba-Lim Foundation, WS Family Foundation, Sen. Francis Pangilinan, E. Zobel Foundation, Globe Telecom, Inc., C Com Foundation, and Ford Foundation Philippines.

In March 2012, Museo Pambata was shortlisted and received a Special Commendation from the jury of the First Children’s Museum Award in Bologna, Italy “for inspiring the creation of new children’s museums in the Philippines and Asia.”

Museo Pambata also received a Best Soft Power Cultural Organization nomination in the 2016 Leading Cultural Destinations Awards. (“the Oscars for museums”)

Theme Rooms

There are eight theme rooms in Museo Pambata, namely:

 Kalikasan (Environment) and Karagatan (Under the Sea) - Contains a simulated rain forest and seabed where visitors can learn about environmental concerns and ecological conservation.
 Maynila Noon (Old Manila) - Visitors can learn about history by looking at artifacts and simulated exhibits depicting turn-of-the-century Manila.
 Paglaki Ko (Career Options) - Showcases various careers and encourages visitors to visualize themselves doing a particular career. Currently it features writers and illustrators.
 I Love My Planet Earth - Where visitors can learn about climate change and how one can take part in caring for the planet.
 Pamilihang Bayan (Marketplace) - Features a row of play stores and shops. One can pretend to be a store owner and practice their entrepreneurial skills.
 Katawan Ko (My Body Works) - Features the human body, how various organs work, and pointers on healthcare.
 Bata sa Mundo (Children in the Global Village) - Dolls from around the world are displayed in this room.

The museum also has a children's library, changing exhibits hall, gift shop, three venues for various events, playground, and parking space.

Programs

Children's Rights
Museo Pambata’s educational programs and special activities are anchored on the advocacy of children’s rights, primarily on their right to education, health, recreation, and mental and physical development.

An outstanding activity held in the Karapatan Hall, an area in the museum dedicated to children’s rights, is the Rights of the Child Awareness Tournament in 1995. It was followed by Mag-ROCK Tayo! (Rights Of the Child Kontest) in 2001-2002. In cooperation with the Council for the Welfare of Children (CWC), Plan International, UNICEF, Department of Social Welfare and Development (DSWD), Department of Education (DepEd), and the Manila City schools, these projects familiarized children with their basic rights as stated in the UN Convention on the Rights of the Child.

Kanino ba ang CRC? was a three-day children’s summit held in November 2009 to celebrate the 20th anniversary of the Convention on the Rights of the Child. The summit brought together 50 children who are living in different, often difficult situations. The summit aimed to raise awareness on the Convention on the Rights of the Child by posing the question “Whose responsibility is the CRC?”.  Children participants, in plenary and discussions in workshops, shared their views of the rights and responsibilities of the child and crafted messages to people and agencies concerned. The summit was organized with the help of the DSWD, UNICEF, National Council of Social Development, Children’s Lab, CHILDHOPE Asia-Philippines, and other private donors.

Literacy Programs
Started in 1995, the Mobile Library Program is a reading campaign for the economically disadvantaged children and out-of-school youth of Manila. It aims to impart the value of reading to children through storytelling and book-lending sessions. Six years later, the Mobile Library van was inaugurated through a grant from Ford Foundation Philippines. It is a six-wheeler roving library with over 3,000 children’s books and other learning aids for the benefit of the children of Manila and neighboring cities. In 2011, the van was refurbished through the help of Atty. Ging Gonzalez-Montinola and Pilipinas Hino, Inc.

In line with the Philippine Centennial celebration in 1998, Museo Pambata launched Aklat: Karapatan at Kapangyarihan para sa Kabataan (The Book: The Right and Empowerment of the Youth) or Aklat:KKK. It had two components: the outreach and the in-house programs. Four minilibraries were turned over to the Manila barangays as part of the outreach component, while storytelling sessions became regular Friday and Saturday activities at the Museo Pambata Library and Resource Center.

In 1999, the Office of Manila Mayor Lito Atienza and Museo Pambata launched Sa Aklat Sisikat!, a Manila-wide literacy campaign to promote the habit of reading among children in Manila’s public schools. This innovative pilot campaign addressed the alarming decline in reading abilities and literacy rate in the country, particularly among public schoolchildren.

References

Bibliography

External links

 Museopambata.org: Official Museo Pambata website

Museums in Manila
Buildings and structures in Ermita
Children's museums
1994 establishments in the Philippines
Child-related organizations in the Philippines